Atimonan, officially the Municipality of Atimonan,  is a 1st class municipality in the province of Quezon, Philippines. According to the 2020 census, it has a population of 64,260 people.

Atimonan is bounded by the municipalities of Gumaca, Plaridel, Pagbilao and Padre Burgos.

Geography

Barangays

Atimonan is politically subdivided into 42 barangays.

Climate

History

There were conflicting stories on how Atimonan got its name. Some concluded that the name Atimonan originated from a tree known as Atimon alleged to have been prevalent in the area and had reportedly served many uses to the residents. These trees are now extinct and its non-existence could not be accounted for.

Others say it came from the words atin muna, signifying a policy, unity of feeling, and sentiments among the residents that bolster their spirit in the fight against their enemies during that time.

But the most popular version is that it originated from the name of its founder, Simeona Mangaba, known to her town mates as Ate Monang. She is a woman reputed to be of unquestionable leadership, which the people regarded as their adopted parent, leader, and protector.

Ate Monang was the eldest sister of Francisco Mangaba, the first captain of the town. She founded the town on February 4, 1608, along the banks of the big Maling River, now known as Atimonan River.

Living along the riverbank, the people have always been prey to Moro attacks and so for fear of Moro reprisals, the inhabitants decided to transfer to Palsabangon, now a barrio of Pagbilao, Quezon. However, the people felt discontented in Palsabangon because the place abounds in wild crocodiles that from time to time disturbed them.

So, after two years of stay (1610), they left the place and transferred to Babyaw, a part of Atimonan. They settled in Babyaw for almost 14 years but transferred again to another site called Minanukan for some unknown reasons.

In 1635, they again transferred to another place called Bisita, but some families separated from the majority and settled in Yawe, now San Isidro, a barrio in Padre Burgos, Quezon.

The next year, when Simeona Mangaba learned of what happened to the original group of settlers, she, together with Fray Geronimo de Jesus, a Spanish friar, tried to unite them once more and convinced them to return to the place where it was first founded. The place is known now as Bagumbayan was during the time of Captain Pablo Garcia.

On December 23, 1941, The occupation of the Japanese Imperial Army forces entering the towns and landing beaches in Atimonan, Tayabas (now. Quezon).

Demographics

People from Atimonan are called Atimonanins. The primary language is Tagalog, with many local phrases and expressions. Manilans usually understand Atimonan Tagalog, albeit with some frustrations. Atimonanins are mostly Tagalogs, but some have a small percentage of Chinese and Spanish ancestry. Some Atimonanins can also speak Bicolano, Lan-nang, or Spanish.

Religion
The dominant religion in Atimonan is Roman Catholic. The culture in Atimonan is primarily ingrained in rural maritime Filipino settings. Other religions present are:
The Church of Jesus Christ of Latter-day Saints (LDS) (commonly known as Mormon)
Atimonan United Christian Ministries AUCM (Born-Again Christians)
Iglesia Ni Cristo
Seventh Day Adventist
Jehovah's Witnesses
Philippine Independent Church/ Iglesia Filipina Independiente (known as Aglipayans)
Islam
Members Church of God International commonly known as Ang Dating Daan

Our Lady of Angels Parish 

Our Lady of Angels Parish is a member of Roman Catholic Diocese of Lucena.
 Parish Priest: Rev. Msgr. Emmanuel Ma. Villareal
 Parochial Vicar: Rev. Fr. Merlin Las Piñas
 Parochial Vicar: Rev. Fr. Ralph Peñaflorida
 Assisting Priest : Rev. Fr. Paul Liwanag

Parish of Our Lady of Angels (Philippine Independent Church)
 Parish Priest - Rev. Fr. Arnold Manalo Damayan, BTh, BAPA

Philippine Good News International 
 Ptra. Analiza Satrain

Jesus Is Lord Church Atimonan Chapter 
 Ptr. Ding Oraa

Economy 

The economy of Atimonan is sustained by fishing and agriculture. Many also engage in seafaring.

Tourism
The town is part of the Tourism Highway Program of the Department of Tourism.
 Quezon Protected Landscape
 ACEDRE Beach Resort
 Atimonan Feeder Port
 Pinagbanderahan Summit
 Bantakay Fall and Caves
 Atimonan Fish Port
 Atimonan Fish Sanctuary
 De Gracia Beach Floating Cottage
 Green Park Hotel and Resort
 Missy and Zane Hotel de Recepcion
 Villarreal Beach
 Rizza Beach Resort(D'Bay Resort) 
 Playa De Lucia Hotel, Resorts and Restaurant
 Tinandog Heights
 Quezon National Park
ZigZag Park
Lumiliay Waterfalls
Malusak Cave
Cueva Santa
Aloco Falls
Robert's Kainan

Culture

Festivals

Tagultol Fishing Festival
The Tagultol Festival is an evolution of various cultural activities, practiced in previous years by Atimonanins. The Town & Patronal Fiesta every August 1 & 2 is simply celebrated with the usual parade, a cultural program, thanksgiving mass and procession. In 1981, during the administration of then Quezon Board Member and then Mayor of Atimonan Remedios V. Diestro, an activity was started – the Karakol. It is a fluvial parade done in the afternoon of the 2nd day of the fiesta The boats traveled around Lamon Bay within the boundaries of the town proper headed by the Grand Boat where the patron – Nuestra Senora de Los Angeles was aboard. There were singing, dancing & band playing, all in expression of gratitude to the Almighty for the year's bountiful catch. The parade then joined the religious procession and ended at the church.

Later, it was done in the morning after the thanksgiving mass at the Fishing Port and Boat Racing Competition followed after the Karakol. The creation of the Lupong Tagapangasiwa ng Kultura at Sining sa Atimonan (LUPTAKSA) under the leadership of Mr. Francisco T. Laude, a retired public school teacher, put new dimension and vigor to the town's cultural awareness and in the year 2003, the Tagultol Festival was finally launched. Tagultol, an old fishing method used by Atimonanins, was derived from the Tagalog word ugtol, meaning bounce. Tagultol fishing consists of a rectangular stone tied at the end of abaca strings dip in honey. Thorns of calamansi & similar plants with bait were tied 2 feet above the stone before dipping in water and moved in a bouncing movements.
The festival is a five-day celebration starting July 29 until August 2. The celebration is an array of both cultural and sports activities, talent and beauty contests participated by community organizations and individuals and headed by the local government's culture and arts council (LUPTAKSA) and Atimonan Tourism Council.

It can be Held in Aliwan Fiesta 2018 during the festival is Tagultol Fishing Festival represented by: Atimonan Community Dancers.

The street dance is 15 member says:
"The progressive town of Atimonan lies on the western shore of the province of Quezon, bound by flourishing gifts of nature and the abundance of Lamon Bay.   The creation of the Tagultol Fishing Festival 15 years ago brought new vigor to Atimonan’s cultural awareness, as well as an expression of gratitude to the Almighty and the town’s patroness Nuestra Señora de los Angeles for the bountiful catch received by fisherfolk.  The festival shows the old fishing method of “ugtol,” a Tagalog word meaning “bounce”.  Tagultol fishing consists of a rectangular stone tied to a piece of abaca string dipped in honey to make it more resilient in salt water.   The original music was composed by Francisco Laude, founder of Lupong Tagapangasiwa ng Kultura at Sining sa Atimonan.  Please welcome the Atimonan Community Dancers’ portrayal of the Tagultol Fishing festival!"

Pabitin Festival
The Town of Atimonan celebrates the Pabitin Festival every May 15 in honor of the patron saint of farmers, St. Isidore, almost the same in Lucban's Pahiyas Festival. During this festival, every house in the town proper has hanging decor such as vegetables, fruits, suman, dried fish wrapped in plastic and any other kinds of food, and when the statue of St. Isidore have passed the street, then the decoration will be thrown in the people who wants to have the decors.

Education

Secondary & Tertiary

PRIVATE:
Quezonian Educational College Inc.
Our Lady of the Angels Academy(OLAA)
Leon Guinto Memorial College, Inc.
ACEBA Science & Technology Institute (ASTI) Inc.
College of Science, Technology & Communication (CSTC) Inc.

Secondary

PUBLIC:
Atimonan National Comprehensive High School (ANCHS). 
Maligaya National High School
Malinao Ilaya Integrated National High School
Malusak National High School
San Rafael National High School
Balugohin Integrated National High School

Elementary (Primary)

Private:
Casa dei Patino Montessori School
St. Louie Kids World Learning Center
Our Lady of the Angels Academy 
(Elementary Department) 
Little Angels Montessori Learning Center
Atimonan United Methodist Christian School Inc.

Public:
Atimonan Central Elementary School
Atimonan Central School(ANNEX) 
Buhangin Elementary School
Balubad Elementary School
Caridad Ibaba Elementary School
Inalig Elementary School
Magsaysay Elementary School
Maligaya Elementary School
Malinao Ibaba Elementary School
Malinao Ilaya Elementary School
Malusak Elementary School
Ponon Elementary School
Rizal Elementary School
San Rafael Elementary School
Sapaan Elementary School
Santa Catalina Elementary School (ANNEX) 
Tagbakin Elementary School

Government

Municipal officials (2010–2013):
 Municipal Mayor:  Jose F. Mendoza
 Municipal Vice Mayor:  Joel M. Vergano
 Municipal Councilors:
 Zenaida D. Veranga
 Renato C. Sarmiento
 Cielyn S. Diestro
 Elmer M. Santander
 Maria Aurora A. Tamayo
 Nestor E. Santander
 John Francis L. Luzano
 Roseller A. Magtibay
 PPLB President:  Ernesto S. Amandy
 PPSK President:  Loid John L. Vergaño

Municipal officials (2013-2016):
 Municipal Mayor:  Jose F. Mendoza
 Municipal Vice Mayor:  Joel M. Vergaño
 Municipal Councilors:
 Zenaida D. Veranga
 Rizaldy L. Velasco
 Renato C. Sarmiento
 Elmer M. Santander
 Iñigo P. Mapaye 
 Cielyn S. Diestro-Makayan
 Roseller A. Magtibay
 John Francis L. Luzano
 PPLB President:  Ernesto S. Amandy

Municipal Officials (2016-2019)
 Municipal Mayor:  Engr. Rustico Joven U. Mendoza
 Municipal Vice Mayor:  Zenaida D. Veranga
 Municipal Councilors:
 Elmer M. Santander
 Rizaldy L. Velasco
 Nestor E. Santander
 Estela A. Lim
 Roseller A. Magtibay
 Maria Aurora A. Tamayo
 Nestor V. Laude
 Merlinda C. Pesigan
 PPLB President:Amado A. Vidal
 PPSK President: Dexter B. Alegre

Gallery

References

External links

Atimonan Profile at PhilAtlas.com
Official Website of Atimonan Municipal Government
[ Philippine Standard Geographic Code]
Philippine Census Information
Local Governance Performance Management System

Populated places established in 1608
Municipalities of Quezon
1608 establishments in the Spanish Empire